Sione's Wedding is the soundtrack to the New Zealand film, Sione's Wedding.  It was released alongside the film in 2006 by Dawn Raid Entertainment.

Track listing
Brothaz - Nesian Mystik
Move, Make Way - Savage featuring Tyree and PNC
I Can See- Ladi 6I Do Believe - Tha Feelstyle featuring Mareko, Flowz, Lapi Mariner & Manuel BundyLet's Stay Together - AdeazeForever - Aaradhna featuring Kevin SoulBetter Than Change - Dallas & MuThey Don't Know - Savage featuring AaradhnaGold - Verse TwoKnowing You (Classic '96 Symphonic Version) - Jamoa JamA Life With You - AdeazeFor Today - Netherworld Dancing ToysChillin' - DeceptikonzSu'amalie - Tha FeelstyleWhateva - Dei HamoKnowing You'' - Aaradhna

Compilation albums by New Zealand artists
2006 compilation albums
2006 soundtrack albums
Comedy film soundtracks